Jarlath Conroy (born 30 September 1944) is an Irish theatre, film and television actor. Since 1971, he has become a successful actor appearing in film and television, including NYPD Blue, Law & Order, and Law & Order: Criminal Intent. He also appeared in the movies Day of the Dead and The Art of Getting By.  He is also the voice actor of Seamus in John Saul's Blackstone Chronicles and Aiden O'Malley in Rockstar Games's Grand Theft Auto IV.

In 2016 The Yale Repertory Theatre mounted a production of Samuel Beckett's Happy Days with Jarlath Conroy as "Willie" opposite Dianne Wiest as "Winnie", it was directed by James Bundy.  The production subsequently transferred to Downtown Brooklyn, New York's Theatre for a New Audience with Wiest and Conroy reprising their roles in April & May 2017.

Selected filmography
Heaven's Gate (1980) - Mercenary in Suit
The Elephant Man (1982 television film) - Will
Day of the Dead (1985) - Bill McDermott
NYPD Blue (1994 television series) - School Teacher (Episode: Double Abandando)
John Saul's Blackstone Chronicles (1998 video game) - Seamus (voice)
Kinsey (2004) - Grocer
Stay (2005) - English Man
The Marconi Bros. (2008) - Irish Priest
Grand Theft Auto IV (2008 video game) - Aiden O'Malley (voice)
True Grit (2010) - The Undertaker
The Art of Getting By (2011) - Harris McElroy
Roadie (2011) - Wes, Motel Clerk
Law & Order: Special Victims Unit (2011 television series) - Mr. Coogan (Episode: "Missing Pieces")
Putsel (2012) - McGinty
August Heat (2014 short film) - Charles
The Knick (2015 television series) - The Hypnoist (2 episodes)
To Keep the Light (2016) - Inspector of the Light
Night of the Living Dead 2 (2021)

References

External links

Jarlath Conroy Official Website Chang, Lia.

1944 births
Alumni of RADA
Irish expatriates in the United States
Irish male film actors
Irish male television actors
Living people
Male actors from County Galway